Bottle Lake may refer to:
 Bottle Lake, New Zealand, suburb of Christchurch, New Zealand
 Bottle Lake Forest, forest making up most of the Christchurch suburb
 Bottle Lake (Nova Scotia), lake in Canada